Mendel ben Ḥayyim Judah Bresslau (1760–1829) was a Silesian Hebraist, writer, and bookseller.

Along with fellow Maskil Isaac Abraham Euchel, he founded language in Königsberg the Me'assefim society for the promotion of the Hebrew. He published numerous articles in the organization's periodical, Ha-Me'assef ('The Collector').

Among other works, Bresslau was the author of an allegorical ethical dialogue, Yaldut u-baḥarut ('Childhood and Youth'; Berlin, 1786). He also wrote Gelilot Eretz Israel, a geography of the Land of Israel with two maps (Breslau, 1819), and Reshit ha-keriah (Breslau, 1834), a Hebrew reader and grammar with the phonetic method.

Selected publications

References
 

1760 births
1829 deaths
Grammarians of Hebrew
Hebraists
Hebrew-language writers
People of the Haskalah
Silesian Jews
Writers from Wrocław